Michael Anthony Moriarty, SC (born 15 June 1946) is a retired Irish judge who served as a Judge of the High Court from 1996 to 2018 and a Judge of the Circuit Court from 1987 to 1996.

Early career 

Born in Belfast to parents James and Nora Moriarty. He moved to Dublin in 1960 and was educated at Blackrock College, University College Dublin and King's Inns. He was called to the bar in 1968, and became a Senior Counsel in March 1982. He specialised in criminal law at the bar.

He was appointed Chairman of the Employment Appeals Tribunal in 1986.

Judicial career 

He became a Judge of the Circuit Court in 1987. He was appointed a Judge of the High Court in March 1996. He was the chairperson of the Lord Mayor's Commission on Crime.

He is best known as Chair of the Moriarty Tribunal, which he chaired between 1997 and 2010. The Tribunal investigated the financial affairs of former Taoiseach Charles Haughey and former Minister Michael Lowry. The first report, in 2006, found that Haughey had misappropriated funds. The second report, delivered in 2011, found that Lowry had shared information with Denis O'Brien "of significant value and assistance" to aid in the awarding of a mobile telephone licence.

He retired in April 2018, following 31 years as a judge.

Personal life 

He was formerly married to Mary Irvine, with whom he has three children. He subsequently married Doreen Delahunty.

References

1946 births
Living people
Irish Senior Counsel
20th-century Irish lawyers
Alumni of University College Dublin
High Court judges (Ireland)
Circuit Court (Ireland) judges
People educated at Blackrock College
Lawyers from Belfast
Alumni of King's Inns